Emmaus is a borough in Lehigh County, Pennsylvania. As of the 2020 U.S. census, it had a population of 11,652. Emmaus is located in the Lehigh Valley, the third largest metropolitan area in Pennsylvania and 68th largest metropolitan area in the nation.

In 2007 and again in 2009, Emmaus was listed as one of the top 100 "Best Places to Live" in the United States by Money magazine.

History

18th century
Emmaus was settled in the early 1700s during the colonial era by German Protestants of the Lutheran and Reformed faiths who had fled religious persecution in Europe. Its earliest German settlers were primarily farmers. Three historic Emmaus residential structures built during the 18th and 19th centuries, each still standing, have been added to the National Register of Historic Places. Shelter House, constructed in 1734 by Pennsylvania Dutch settlers, is the oldest building structure in Emmaus and the oldest continuously occupied structure in the Lehigh Valley. The other two historic residences are Jacob Ehrenhardt Jr. House, built in 1803 by American Revolutionary patriot militia member Jacob Ehrenhardt, Jr., and Kemmerer House, a farmstead built between 1840 and 1850.

In 1741, the original land on which Emmaus now lies was donated to the Moravian Church by Sebastian Heinrich Knauss and Jacob Ehrenhardt for the purpose of creating a closed faith-based village. The village was originally named Salzburg. At the time of its founding in 1759, it was one of the four leading Moravian communities in the Northeastern United States (Bethlehem, Lititz and Nazareth, each in Pennsylvania, were the others). 

Two years later, in 1761, Moravian Bishop August Gottlieb Spangenberg announced the town's new name would be Emmaus, saying "Now here we build a village small; toward its completion we give all. Here, too, our hearts within shall flame; Emmaus then shall be its name." For approximately 100 years, until the mid-19th century, Emmaus was a closed community of the Moravian Church. Emmaus was named for the Biblical village of Emmaus, where, according to the Bible's Gospel of Luke, Jesus was seen by his disciples Luke and Cleopas in what is known as his Road to Emmaus appearance following his crucifixion and resurrection.

From its founding in 1759 until 1830, the settlement's name was spelled "Emmaus." From 1830 until 1938, however, the community used the Pennsylvania Dutch spelling of the name, "Emaus," with a line above the "m" to indicate a double letter. As English began emerging as the prevalent language in Pennsylvania, however, the line often was often omitted, leading to confusion about the correct spelling. In 1938, the local Rotary Club circulated petitions in support of changing the spelling to "Emmaus," and its spelling was changed to match the English version of the Bible's King James Version. Despite the 1938 spelling change, a major borough thoroughfare, Emaus Avenue, continues to retain the pre-1938 spelling.

19th century
Emmaus and the metropolitan Allentown area contributed considerable numbers of volunteers to the Union Army during the American Civil War. Volunteers from the region comprised roughly 70 percent of the 47th Pennsylvania Infantry Regiment, which mobilized after the April 1861 fall of Fort Sumter, engaging Confederate forces throughout southern states through the Civil War's conclusion. On June 7, 1930, Emmaus erected the Emaus Honor Roll (using the borough's initial spelling) in a mini-park between Third and Fourth Streets in honor of Emmaus residents who served in the 47th Regiment during the Civil War and those who later served in the Spanish–American War and World War I.

Iron ore was discovered in and near Emmaus in the 19th century. Beginning in 1850, the Donaldson Iron Company in Emmaus mined and processed iron ore and manufactured cast iron pipes and other iron-related products. In 1859, Reading Company constructed railroad lines through Emmaus, which are still functioning. The same year, the town was incorporated as a borough. In 1869, the town's first blast furnace opened. Iron ore production fueled the town's growth through the second half of the 19th century and early 20th century. During the 19th century, Emmaus was also a center of silk and cigar manufacturing.

20th and 21st centuries
In 1940, public census statistics showed that 6,731 people lived in Emmaus. The population of the borough has since nearly doubled to 11,467 as of the 2020 census. Housing construction has reached the borough line in all directions so significant continued population growth in the borough is unlikely. Outside the borough line, however, the local population continues to grow, particularly in neighboring Lower Macungie Township. Consequently, growth in the Emmaus ZIP Code continues to expand but not within its borough limits.

Geography
Emmaus borders South Mountain, a large Appalachian mountain range. The town's elevation is 436 feet above sea level. It has a hot-summer humid continental climate (Dfa) and is in hardiness zone 6b. Average monthly temperatures in the downtown vicinity range from 28.9 °F in January to 73.5 °F in July.

Demographics

As of the 2010 U.S. census, there were 11,313 people, 4,985 households, and 3,155 families residing in the borough. The population density was 3,918.8 people per square mile (1,511.4/km2). There were 5,186 housing units at an average density of 1,796.4 per square mile (692.8/km2). The racial makeup of the borough was 95.89% White, 0.70% African American, 0.06% Native American, 1.81% Asian, 0.03% Pacific Islander, 0.88% from other races, and 0.63% from two or more races. Hispanic or Latino of any race were 1.51% of the population.

Of the borough's 4,985 households, 26.4% had children under the age of 18 living with them, 50.9% were married couples living together, 9.1% had a female householder with no husband present, and 36.7% were non-families. 31.5% of all households were made up of individuals, and 13.6% had someone living alone who was 65 years of age or older. The average household size was 2.26 and the average family size was 2.85.

In the borough, the population was spread out, with 21.2% under the age of 18, 6.6% from 18 to 24, 31.0% from 25 to 44, 22.1% from 45 to 64, and 19.1% who were 65 years of age or older. The median age was 40 years. For every 100 females, there are 91.7 males. For every 100 females age 18 and over, there were 88.8 males. Median income for a household in the borough was $55,139, whereas the estimated median household for the state of Pennsylvania is $52,007, and median income for a family was $54,120. Males had a median income of $38,659 versus $25,331 for females. Per capita income for the borough was $23,245. About 2.2% of families and 3.5% of the population were below the poverty line, including 1.2% of those under age 18 and 7.9% of those age 65 or over as of 2010.

Industry and commerce

Buckeye Pipe Line, a United States petroleum distributor, is headquartered locally, between Emmaus and Macungie. The largest major shopping mall in the Emmaus area is South Mall, located on Lehigh Street on Emmaus' border with Salisbury Township and Allentown. South Mall is one of four major shopping malls in Allentown and its immediate suburbs.

Emmaus is home to Shangy's, one of the nation's largest beer distributors with over 4,000 domestic and imported beer brands, that attracts thousands of beer enthusiasts from around the nation each year. Yocco's Hot Dogs, the Lehigh Valley-based fast food establishment known for their regionally-famous hot dogs and cheesesteaks, maintains its corporate headquarters on East Minor Street in Emmaus with four locations in the Lehigh Valley. 

The Emmaus Arts Commission hosts art and film events in Emmaus, including "Art in the Garden," "Emmaus Art Walk," the "Student Horror Film Festival," and others.  Each October, Emmaus also hosts an annual Halloween parade, one of the largest in the Lehigh Valley, combined with a 5K Race, which is held just before the parade's start and is a major fundraiser for the Parade Committee and the Parks and Recreation Commission.

Emmaus was the former headquarters of Rodale, Inc., one of the world's largest publishers of health-related books and magazines, including Men's Health, Prevention, Runner's World, and Women's Health magazines. In 2018, the company was acquired by Hearst and local offices were moved to Easton.

Public education
Emmaus is served educationally by the East Penn School District, a public school district that accommodates kindergarten through 12th grade.

The district operates a high school, Emmaus High School located in Emmaus (for grades nine through 12), two middle schools, Eyer Middle School and Lower Macungie Middle School (both located in Macungie for grades six through eight), seven public elementary schools (Alburtis Elementary School, Jefferson Elementary School, Lincoln Elementary School, Macungie Elementary School, Shoemaker Elementary School, Wescosville Elementary School, and Willow Lane Elementary School), and one public elementary charter school (Seven Generations Charter School, located in Emmaus).

Transportation

Interstate 476, the most prominent highway passing through Emmaus, traverses the western portion of the borough along the Pennsylvania Turnpike's Northeast Extension. However, the nearest interchange is two townships away in South Whitehall Township. I-476 heads north to Wyoming Valley and south to Plymouth Meeting near Philadelphia. The only numbered highway providing direct access to the borough is Pennsylvania Route 29, which enters from the southwest via Chestnut Street and exits to the northwest via Cedar Crest Boulevard. Lehigh Street, the other thoroughfare serving the borough, is located on the borough's east-side. Both highways have junctions with I-78, which spans from Lebanon County in the west to the Holland Tunnel and Lower Manhattan in the east. LANta provides bus service to and from Emmaus on its Route 104 service through Allentown to and from the Lehigh Valley Mall in Whitehall Township.

Notable people
Charles Bierbauer, former CNN correspondent
Margaret W. "Hap" Brennecke, NASA metallurgist 
Howard J. Buss, composer and music publisher
Todd Howard, director and executive producer at Bethesda Game Studios
Aaron Gray, former professional basketball player, Chicago Bulls, Detroit Pistons, New Orleans Hornets and Sacramento Kings
Keith Jarrett, jazz pianist
Michael Johns, health care executive and former White House presidential speechwriter
Trina Radke, 1988 U.S. Olympian, U.S. swimming team
J. I. Rodale, founder of Rodale, Inc.
Robert Rodale, publisher
Cindy Werley, 1996 U.S. Olympian, U.S. field hockey team

References

External links

 Official website
 Emmaus news at The Morning Call
 Emmaus, Pennsylvania at "Best Places to Live", Money magazine, 2007

 
1759 establishments in Pennsylvania
Boroughs in Lehigh County, Pennsylvania
Boroughs in Pennsylvania
Moravian settlement in Pennsylvania
Privatization controversies
Privatization in the United States
Populated places established in 1759
Settlements in the America (North) Province of the Moravian Church